Fabio Ongaro (born 23 September 1977 in Venice) is an Italian rugby union footballer. Although he now plays as a hooker, he played in the Italian youth teams as a flanker.

Career
Ongaro first played for Rugby Casale (1994/95-1997/98), spending the most prolific time of his career at Benetton Treviso (1998/99-2005/06), where he won 5 Italian Championships (1998/99, 2000/01, 2002/03, 2003/04 and 2005/06), a Cup of Italy (2004/05) and a Supercup (2006). He moved to Saracens, in England, where he played from 2006/07 to 2009/10. He has played for Aironi since 2010/11.

Ongaro won his first cap in 2000 when the Azzurri played against Canada in Rovigo, in a 17–22 loss. Ongaro played every match for Italy in the 2003 World Cup. He scored the crucial try that helped beat Scotland 20–14 in Rome in the 2004 Six Nations Championship. His rise to the top peaked in November 2004 when he was named as Italy captain in place of the injured Marco Bortolami. He played 2 matches at the 2007 Rugby World Cup. He has been a regular player at the Six Nations since 2003.
He played his last international match for Italy against Scotland on 17 March 2012.

Coaching career
Ongaro became Assistant Coach at Benetton Treviso from the start of the 2016/17 season.

Doping allegations
In 2003 Ongaro, alongside fellow international Gianluca Faliva, had been accused of having made use of Epoetin beta (NeoRecormon) for doping purposes. In 2009 the trial was concluded with a sentence of absolution for Faliva and Ongaro, as no proof of either of them using or detaining the doping substance could be presented.

References

External links
RBS 6 Nations profile
Fabio Ongaro International Statistics

1977 births
Living people
Sportspeople from Venice
Italian rugby union players
Rugby union hookers
Benetton Rugby players
Saracens F.C. players
Aironi players
Italy international rugby union players
Drugs in sport in Italy
Italian expatriate rugby union players
Expatriate rugby union players in England
Italian expatriate sportspeople in England